The 1956 Nebraska gubernatorial election was held on November 6, 1956, and featured incumbent Governor Victor E. Anderson, a Republican, defeating Democratic nominee, former state Senator Frank Sorrell, as well as independent George Morris, to win a second two-year term in office.

Democratic primary

Candidates
Ted Baum
Frank Sorrell, former member of the Nebraska Legislature

Results

Republican primary

Candidates
Victor E. Anderson, incumbent Governor
Edwin L. Hart, plastics company owner

Results

General election

Results

References

Gubernatorial
1956
Nebraska